VL Paarma (English: Gadfly) was a Finnish biplane, two-seat trainer aircraft, designed by the State Aircraft Factory (Valtion Lentokonetehdas) for use with the Finnish Air Force.

Design and development
A prototype was constructed in 1930–31 and made its maiden flight on 20 March 1931. The aircraft was, however, under-powered, and the flight characteristics were poor. Suggestions for improvements were made and the engine was replaced by a higher-powered one. The aircraft was damaged in 1933, but was never repaired.

Specifications (Paarma)

References

1930s Finnish military aircraft